Quinto (Barrio Quinto) is one of the 31 barrios of the municipality of Ponce, Puerto Rico.   Together with Primero, Segundo, Tercero, Cuarto, and Sexto, Quinto is one of the municipality's six original urban barrios. It was organized in 1878.

Location
Quinto is an urban barrio located in the southern section of the municipality, within the Ponce city limits, and northeast of the traditional center of the city, Plaza Las Delicias.

Boundaries

Barrio Quinto is bounded on the North by Guadalupe Street, on the South by Isabel Street, on the West by Atocha Street, and on the East by Rio Portugues.

In terms of barrio-to-barrio boundaries, Quinto is bounded in the North by Sexto, in the South by Tercero, in the West by Segundo, and in the East by Machuelo Abajo.

Features and demographics
Quinto has  of land area and no water area.  In 2000, the population of Qinto was 724. The population density in Quinto was 6,811 persons per square mile.

In 2010, the population of Quinto was 568 persons, and it had a density of 5,680 persons per square mile.

Notable landmarks
Quinto is home to the Museo Francisco Pancho Coimbre. Also, the Isabel II Marketplace (Plaza del Mercado de Ponce) is located here. NRHP-listed landmarks in Barrio Quinto include the Font-Ubides House, the Mercado de las Carnes (Plaza Juan Ponce de León), and the old Spanish Military Headquarters/city jail.

Gallery

See also

 List of communities in Puerto Rico

References

External links

Barrio Quinto
1878 establishments in Puerto Rico